The 2018 Latvian First League (referred to as the komanda.lv Pirmā līga for sponsorship reasons) started on 21 April 2018 and ended on 21 October 2018.

League table

First round

Second round

External links 
 The First League on the Latvian Football Federation website
  League321.com - Latvian football league tables, records & statistics database. 

Latvian First League seasons
2
Latvia
Latvia